Ahmadabad (also Romanized as Aḩmadābād) is a village in Jolgeh Rural District of the Central District of Behabad County, Yazd province, Iran. At the 2006 National Census, its population was 1,085 in 249 households, when it was in Behabad District of Bafq County. The following census in 2011 counted 1,131 people in 323 households, by which time the district had been elevated to the status of a county. The latest census in 2016 showed a population of 1,260 people in 390 households; it was the largest village in its rural district.

References 

Behabad County

Populated places in Yazd Province

Populated places in Behabad County